

Primary maritime cargo types 

References

Intermodal containers
Economic globalization
Freight transport